Gerard Quinn  is a professor of law at the University of Leeds and at the Wallenberg Institute in the University of Lund, Sweden. He was formerly professor of law at  NUI Galway, Ireland, and Director of the university's Centre for Disability Law and Policy at the  School of Law.  He was appointed to the Council of State by the President of Ireland, Michael D. Higgins in 2012.

He is a graduate of University College, Galway. He was called to the Irish Bar in 1983. He was awarded a masters (LLM) and doctorate in law (SJD) from Harvard Law School. He is a global authority on international and comparative disability law and policy.

In October, 2020, Quinn was appointed by the United Nations Human Rights Council as the UN Special Rapporteur on the Rights of Persons with Disabilities.  Following Quinn's appointment, his ideas on the importance of disability law and policy have been disseminated by Open Society Foundations, the European Network on Independent Living, and elsewhere.

References

External links
Website of the President of Ireland

Living people
Year of birth missing (living people)
Presidential appointees to the Council of State (Ireland)
Academics of the University of Galway
Alumni of the University of Galway
Harvard Law School alumni